Georges Contenau (April 9, 1877 – March 22, 1964) was a French archeologist, curator, orientalist and religious historian who was an expert in the field of culture and religion of the ancient civilizations of the Near and Middle East.

Life
Contenau was  professor at the University of Brussels from 1932 to 1947. He was chief curator of Oriental antiquities - in French the Département des Antiquités orientales - at the Musée du Louvre from 1927 to 1946. He led several archaeological expeditions to Susa, Sidon and Nahavand. From 1946 to 1957 he was director general of the French Archaeological Mission in Iran.

He wrote about the civilization of the Babylonians and Assyrians (1922), their daily life (1950), their Magic (1947) and divination (1940). He also wrote on the Phoenicians (1926), Hittite and Hurrians (1948). He issued a four-volume Handbook of Oriental Archaeology (1927–1947) and commenced the publication of the Encyclopédie d'archéologie orientale (1914–1957).

One of his students at the École du Louvre was Denise Cocquerillat and his assistant was Marguerite Rutten.

Some publications 
L'Art de l'Asie occidentale ancienne, Paris, éd. G. van Oest, 1928
les civilisations des Hittites et des Mitanniens, Paris, 1934
La Civilisation d'Assur et de Babylone, Paris, 1937
La Médecine en Assyrie et en Babylonie, Paris, 1937, 2de éd. 1951
La Divination chez les Assyriens et les Babyloniens, 1940
La Vie quotidienne à Babylone et en Assyrie, Paris, 1950 (translated into several languages)
Les religions de l'Orient ancien, 1957
Les civilisations anciennes du Proche-Orient, Paris, éd. Presses Universitaires de France, coll. Que sais-je ?, 1960
  Liste des ouvrages de Contenau traduits en allemand

References

External links 
 Georges Contenau on data.bnf.fr

French Assyriologists
1877 births
1964 deaths
People from Laon
Officiers of the Légion d'honneur
French expatriates in Belgium
French archaeologists
20th-century French historians
French historians of religion